Futboll Klubi Sukthi, commonly referred to as FK Sukthi are an Albanian football club founded on 10 July 2009 and based in Sukth (Durres District). Together with Teuta Durrës & KF Erzeni Shijak are three football teams from Durrës. The club's home ground is New Sukth Stadium, which has a seated capacity of 1,000.

Managerial History
This is a chronological list of the managers who have guided FK Sukthi since 2009.

  Xhevair Kapllani  (2009–2013)
  Eduard Curri (2013–2015)
  Ismail Çira (2015)
  Odise Soko (2015–)

References

External links
 FK Sukthi at Soccerway
 FK Sukthi at FSHF.org
 F.K SUKTHI at Facebook

 
Kategoria e Dytë clubs
Football clubs in Durrës
Sport in Durrës
Football clubs in Albania
Association football clubs established in 2009
2009 establishments in Albania